Jiban Bima Tower is a high-rise building located in Dhaka, Bangladesh. It is located in Motijheel, the central business district of the metropolis. Jiban Bima Bhaban is the one of the tallest high-rises in Dhaka City. Currently the head office of Jiban Bima Corporation Bangladesh is in this building along with several banks and other offices. It is constructed by Concord Group.

See also
 List of tallest buildings in Bangladesh
 List of tallest buildings in Dhaka
 Khuda Buksh

References

Buildings and structures in Dhaka
Skyscraper office buildings in Bangladesh
Motijheel Thana